Marta Sánchez Salfrán (born May 17, 1973) is a Cuban volleyball player who competed in the 2004 Summer Olympics.

In 2004, she was a member of the Cuban team which won the bronze medal in the Olympic tournament.

References 
 

1973 births
Living people
Cuban women's volleyball players
Volleyball players at the 2004 Summer Olympics
Olympic volleyball players of Cuba
Olympic medalists in volleyball
Olympic bronze medalists for Cuba
Volleyball players at the 2003 Pan American Games
Pan American Games silver medalists for Cuba
Medalists at the 2004 Summer Olympics
Pan American Games medalists in volleyball
Olympic gold medalists for Cuba
Medalists at the 2003 Pan American Games
21st-century Cuban women